John Isaac Guion (November 18, 1802 – June 6, 1855) was an American politician from Mississippi who served as Governor in 1851.

Biography
Guion was born in Adams County in the Mississippi Territory. He studied law in Lebanon, Tennessee, was admitted to the bar, and established a successful practice in Vicksburg, Mississippi. He practiced in partnership with William L. Sharkey and later with Seargent Smith Prentiss.

A Democrat in politics, Guion was first elected to the Mississippi State Senate in 1842. He later moved to Jackson, and continued to serve in the State Senate.

Guion supported slavery and states' rights. As a result, he played a prominent role in the Jackson convention of 1849, which was called to discuss how the Southern states should respond to the possibility of California being admitted to the union as a free state.

In 1850 Guion was chosen to serve as the Senate's President pro tempore. In February 1851, Governor John A. Quitman resigned to defend himself against charges of aiding in filibustering expeditions against Spanish rule in Cuba. Guion became acting governor and served until November when his Senate term expired. He had not run for reelection, and the Speaker of the Mississippi House had also not. Since no one in the line of succession could assume the governorship, the legislature subsequently chose James Whitfield as an interim replacement, and he served until the term of the new governor started in 1852.

Guion had not run for reelection to the State Senate because he had run for the Mississippi District Circuit Court judge in Jackson. He began his term as scheduled and served until his death. He died on June 6, 1855, and was buried at Greenwood Cemetery in Jackson.

References
John Isaac Guion at National Governors Association
General Tour Information (including burial information for John Isaac Guion) at Greenwood Cemetery

1802 births
1855 deaths
Democratic Party governors of Mississippi
Democratic Party Mississippi state senators
19th-century American politicians